Mikaela Madison Rosberg (born March 25, 1999), known as Mikey Madison, is an American actress. She is best known for her starring roles as Manson Family follower Susan "Sadie" Atkins in Quentin Tarantino's film Once Upon a Time in Hollywood (2019), and Amber Freeman in Scream (2022).

Early life
Madison was born in Los Angeles, California. She has a twin brother, and three other siblings. After her sister married a film writer, Madison left competitive horseback riding to try acting and landed her first role in 2013. She is Jewish.

Career
Madison began her acting career appearing in numerous short films, including Retirement (2013), Pani's Box (2013), and Bound for Greatness (2014). In 2014, Madison starred in her first feature film, Liza, Liza, Skies are Grey, at age 15. The film was not released until 2017. In 2016, she began a starring role as Max Fox in the FX comedy-drama series Better Things, which renewed for a fifth and final season in 2022.

From 2017 to 2018, she guest starred in the Bravo dark comedy series Imposters. In 2018, Madison appeared in the drama films Monster and Nostalgia. She earned further recognition for her role as Susan "Sadie" Atkins in Quentin Tarantino's comedy-drama film Once Upon a Time in Hollywood (2019). She also appeared as Candi the Barista in the animated black comedy film The Addams Family, which was released in October 2019.

In September 2020, Madison was cast as Amber Freeman in the fifth Scream film, which was directed by Matt Bettinelli-Olpin and Tyler Gillett. The film was released on January 14, 2022.

Filmography

Film

Television

References

External links 
 

Living people
Actresses from Los Angeles
American film actresses
American television actresses
1999 births
21st-century American actresses
Jewish American actresses